Somogyaszaló is a village in Somogy county, Hungary.

Etymology
According to the local legends the name derives from the activity of the former residents of the village: food drying. The archive records state that the local people dried woods at that time when the village was established.

External links 
 Street map (Hungarian)

References 

Populated places in Somogy County